The Council of Liubech was one of the best documented princely meetings in Kievan Rus' that took place in Liubech (today in Chernihiv Oblast, Ukraine) in 1097.

As a result, each prince within Kievan Rus’ was given his principality as patrimonial domain.

The council, initiated by Vladimir Monomakh, brought together Sviatopolk II, Vasylko Rostyslavych, Davyd Sviatoslavich, Oleg I, and other Rus' princes. It aimed to stop the Chernigov war of succession, to pacify the people, and to present a unified front against the Polovtsy (Cumans). It resulted in the division of Kievan Rus' among the princes, letting their immediate families inherit them. This broke a rota system (lestvichnoe pravo) that had been followed in Kievan Rus' for two centuries.

The Council assigned/confirmed the principalities as follows:

 Sviatopolk II received Kiev, Turov, Pinsk, and the title of the Grand Prince.
 Vladimir II Monomakh received Pereyaslavl, the Rostov-Suzdal lands, Smolensk, and Beloozero. His son Mstislav received Great Novgorod.
 Oleg, Davyd, and Yaroslav, both sons of Sviatoslav II of Kiev (Grand Prince of Kyiv, 1073–1076), received Chernigiv, Tmutarakan, Ryazan, and Murom.

Of the remaining izgoi princes:

 David Igorevich received Volodymyr.
 Volodar Rostislavich – Peremyshl.
 Vasilko Rostislavich – Terebovl.

This change effectively established a feudal system in Kievan Rus'. It stopped the struggle for Chernigov, but was not observed perfectly. After the death of Sviatopolk in 1113, the citizens of Kyiv revolted and summoned Monomakh to the throne. Nevertheless, the new dispensation allowed other principalities to consolidate their power and to develop as powerful regional centers: most notably Galicia-Volhynia and Vladimir-Suzdal.

See also

List of Ukrainian rulers

References

Bibliography 
 
 
 Power crisis in Ruthenia. Ukrinform. 20 October 2015
 Council of Liubech at the Handbook on History of Ukraine

11th century in Kievan Rus'
1097 in Europe